Rogozhkin is a Russian masculine surname, its feminine counterpart is Rogozhkina. Notable people with the surname include:

Aleksandr Rogozhkin (born 1949), Russian film director and writer
Vital Rahozhkin (born 1976), Belarusian football player

Russian-language surnames